Brian Ford (born 28 August 1970) is a New Zealand former cricketer. He played in one List A match for Canterbury in 1994/95.

See also
 List of Canterbury representative cricketers

References

External links
 

1970 births
Living people
New Zealand cricketers
Canterbury cricketers
People from Kaiapoi
Cricketers from Canterbury, New Zealand